Tomorrow People is a seven-piece New Zealand reggae band that formed in 2010. Their debut album One was released on 1 June 2012 under Illegal Musik / Warner Music and debuted at Number One on the New Zealand charts. It was later certified Gold. They have also released an EP called One.5  in 2014, and a full-length album called Bass & Bassinets in 2015. Their EP "BBQ" Reggae was released in January 2018 and debuted at number one in New Zealand.

History

Early years 
Tomorrow People began as a studio project in 2010 between four friends who were in a previous band together. Avina Kelekolio (production, toasting), Lio Fili (bass, production), Tana Tupai (keys) and Liam Va'ai (vocals) all played together in the covers band Terakey, and in their spare time they recorded some songs at Avina's home studio setup in Wellington. Once they had a handful of original songs, the group uploaded their music to YouTube. The social media public had a listen to "One More Time", "Jammin"  and "Sundown Girl" and it was not long before they were asked if they could play some live shows.

As they did not have a live band at the time, Elia Feterika (drums), Analote Faletolu (vocals), Aaron Davey (guitar) and La'i Lepou (keys) were recruited to make up the original line up of Tomorrow People. Their first show was an opening slot for New Zealand roots reggae band Three Houses Down in Masterton.

2012: ONE 
The band's debut album was entirely written by the original four members. Avina Kelekolio did the overall production while the others contributed ideas in Avina's home studio. Mixing and mastering was all done in-house. The first single to be released was "Feel Alright" featuring Hawaiian band Kolohe Kai and although it was a collaboration, the song was done entirely via sending files and ideas back and forth between New Zealand and Hawaii. The song was one of the first reggae songs to be played on urban radio in New Zealand. A trend which continues to this day. 10 songs from this album were released to radio between 2010–2012.

Before the release of the album, original member Liam Va'ai had left the band to focus on other things. Despite being co-credited with majority of the album, he does not appear in any of the band's music videos.

The album ONE stayed in the New Zealand music charts for a span of 52 weeks. It was certified Gold, won a Waiata Music Award  and a nomination for Pacific Album of the Year VPMA, and Best Roots Album and the NZVMA.

2013: ONE.5 
In 2013, Tomorrow People released an 8-track EP titled ONE.5. This was to be an extension of the original "ONE" album. With new members on board, they varied their style and incorporated elements of R&B and pop into some of their songs. Hennie Tui contributed his R&B style which can be heard on the songs "So Far" and "All I Wanna Do". The first song to be released was "So Far" and it gave a new direction to the band. The EP also gave spotlight to new vocalists Kenape Saupese (Kensau), Luke Whaanga and Johanna Tepania.

2015: Bass & Bassinets 
Bass & Bassinets represented a new start and refresh of the band. With only three members remaining from the ONE album, the band varied their approach to songwriting. With new members Hamo Dell, Daniel Sugrue and Marcus Abraham on board, there was a range of different styles being brought to the table. Avina Kelekolio took on the task of production while Tana Tupai was the executive producer with focus on the overall sound. As the band wanted to collaborate more with other musicians, they enlisted the skills of Sammy Johnson, Sons of Zion, Francis Kora, Paua, Lion Rezz, Papa Pablo and The Prxfile for songwriting and collaborations.

2018: "BBQ" Reggae 
In late 2017, Tomorrow People decided to release their 4th offering exclusively at New Zealand's biggest reggae festival 'One Love'. Consisting of 6 originals and 2 language songs, the EP climbed quickly to No.1  on the NZ Official Top 40 charts. From there, the EP gave the band a Waiata Music Award, five Vodafone Pacific Music Awards, a New Zealand Music 'Tui' and a nomination for Best Roots Artist at the 2018 VNZMA. The effort also earned co-managers Tana Tupai and Avina Kelekolio an MMF Music Managers award for Best Self-Managed Artist. Featuring on the EP is Jamaican artist Conkarah.

2021: 21 
In December 2021, Tomorrow People released their third full length album consisting of 16 tracks. They released these songs throughout the year as part of their "First Fridays" campaign. This 'waterfall release' method was the first of its kind, and it allowed the band to effectively release 12 singles along with 1 album.

Discography

Albums

Singles released

Featured appearances

Awards

References 

New Zealand reggae musical groups
Musical groups established in 2010
Warner Music labels
2010 establishments in New Zealand
Pacific reggae
Māori-language singers